Qasemlu (also Romanized as Qāsemlū) is a village in Baranduzchay-ye Jonubi Rural District, in the Central District of Urmia County, West Azerbaijan Province, Iran. At the 2006 census, its population was 447, in 93 families.

References 

Populated places in Urmia County